The Inside is an American crime drama television series created by Tim Minear and Howard Gordon and produced by Imagine Television. The Inside follows the work of the FBI's Los Angeles Violent Crimes Unit (VCU), a division dedicated to investigating particularly dangerous crimes. The Inside initially aired on the Fox Network from June 8 to July 13, 2005. Although thirteen episodes were produced, Fox aired only seven episodes before canceling the series. Thirteen episodes were subsequently aired on ITV4 in the UK in 2006.

Premise 
Rookie FBI Agent Rebecca Locke (Rachel Nichols) joins the Los Angeles Violent Crimes Unit (VCU) after the death of a previous member. While she proves to be a brilliant investigator, she has a secret known only to herself and the VCU's mysterious director Virgil "Web" Webster (Peter Coyote): that as a 10-year-old girl, Rebecca was kidnapped from her home and held captive for 18 months. Astonishingly enough, no one found and rescued her; she escaped the trauma all by herself, setting a fire and escaping in the resulting chaos. Webster manipulates Rebecca's experience on each case, using the insight she gained through it to establish the mindset of the victim—and the criminal.

Another sidebar to the plot is the moral struggle between Webster, who seems willing to use Rebecca's gift to catch the "unsub" at all costs, and Rebecca's partner Paul Ryan (Jay Harrington), who views himself as the voice of conscience in the battle for Rebecca's soul. Additionally, Webster's past is very much unknown; viewers are left wondering exactly how much he has in common with the perpetrators he pursues.

Cast and characters 
 Rebecca Locke (Rachel Nichols) is the rookie field agent brought in by Web, who wishes to use her gift to his advantage. She is able to put herself in the shoes of the victims, since she was one herself. This makes her excellent at getting inside the mind of a killer. Series creator Minear described her as a "character with no inside," hence the show's title. With clear trust issues and a lack of a social life, she slowly grows to like her colleagues more as the series progressed.
 Danny Love (Adam Baldwin) is an ex-marine who is blunt and crude, but not without his own morals and has a certain rapport with Agent Melody Sim. He often leads assaults on crime scenes. Originally his name was to be Danny Coulter.
 Melody "Mel" Sim (Katie Finneran) is a quick-witted, intelligent and friendly agent who often mourns her lack of social life and shares a friendship with Danny.
 Carter Howard (Nelsan Ellis) is the technological go-to guy of the group, making an appearance whenever the team needs technological expertise.
 Paul Ryan (Jay Harrington) is a young, married agent who Web chose to be his 'conscience'. Idealistic and kind, he sees things in black and white. He is often paired up with Agent Locke, which leads him to discover her past secret. On more than one occasion, he and Web have clashed based on differing principles. Originally, his name was to be Paul Fatorre.
 Virgil "Web" Webster (Peter Coyote): The supervisor. He is not married as far as we can tell. He chose his squad based on their secrets, their weaknesses and their strengths. He is known to push his agents to the max, especially Agent Locke, much to the disgust of Agent Ryan. He is also known to bend the rules or justify actions.

Production 
Originally produced by Kathryn Bigelow, the original premise centered around a 23-year-old woman, Rebecca Locke (Rachel Nichols), posing as a 16-year-old high school student in order to investigate a drug ring. Peter Facinelli was also attached to star. In September 2004, it was announced that Tim Minear would redevelop the series as original creators/executive producers Todd Kessler and Glenn Kessler exited the series. It was also revealed that Brian Grazer, Ron Howard and David Nevins would executive produce the series. In December 2004, Facinelli opted out of the series after Minear revamped the premise to feature Rebecca Locke as young FBI agent working for the L.A. bureau's Violent Crimes Unit. Later in December 2004, Jay Harrington was cast, taking over the role from Facinelli; and Adam Baldwin joined the cast, who worked with Minear on Firefly. In May 2005, Fox announced the series would premiere June 8, 2005, airing Wednesdays at 9:00 pm. Fox aired seven episodes (although out of production order) before canceling the series due to low ratings.

Episodes 
Seven episodes originally aired on Fox between June 8 and July 13, 2005. The other six episodes that were unaired by Fox first aired in the UK on ITV4 in 2006.

Fox aired the episodes out of order. The episode listing below is the correct viewing order, not the airing order. Creator Tim Minear posted the correct episode order on his website.

References

External links 
 
 PopGurls' review of the show, which doubles as an appreciation of the Rebecca Locke character
 Part One of an interview with Minear, in which he discusses the demise of the series
 Part Two of that interview, in which Minear talks about plots that audiences will not see because of cancellation
 Part Three, where Minear speaks on his future projects, including an Inside DVD

2005 American television series debuts
2005 American television series endings
2000s American crime drama television series
2000s American police procedural television series
English-language television shows
Fox Broadcasting Company original programming
Television series by 20th Century Fox Television
Television shows set in Los Angeles
Television series by Imagine Entertainment